Matthew Thomas Broderick (December 1, 1877 in Lattimer, Pennsylvania – February 26, 1940 in Freeland, Pennsylvania), was a former professional baseball player who played in two games, one at second base, and one as a pinch hitter, for the Brooklyn Superbas during the  baseball season.

External links

1877 births
1940 deaths
Baseball players from Pennsylvania
Major League Baseball second basemen
Niagara Purple Eagles baseball players
Brooklyn Superbas players
Buffalo Bisons (minor league) players
Hamilton Hams players
Akron Champs players
Steubenville Stubs players
Erie Sailors players
Reading (baseball) players